Koonur or Kunoor or Kunur is a village in Jangaon district of Telangana, India. It falls under Zaffergadh mandal with pin code 506143. Erstwhile part of Warangal district and migrated to Jangaon district during new state reorganization process. The village has history of  close to 150 years predominantly ruled by Brahmin section until during the independent and post independent era.

Kunur has a rich history on vaishnava culture with 100+ years old Ranganayaka temple (lord Vishnu sleeping on Adiseshu). The Temple was built by Nellutla Ventakeshwara Rao, later managed by his son, Nellutla Varavara Rao. Post Shri Vara Vara Rao's demise the Temple Trustee was managed by his daughter in law (Mrs. Vakula Devi Nellutla) and his grand children. In 1919 the Temple was constructed by Shri Venkateshwara Rao garu, he dreamt that lord Ranganayaka has told his whereabouts and ordered Venkateshwara Rao to find him and build a temple. Next day Morning Venkateshwara Rao along with some of the villagers searched for Ranganayaka statue as per the clues left by lord himself in the dream. they found the Satue on the banks of rivulet (Vaagu in telugu) passes between Kunur village and Uppugallu village. Shri Venkateshwara Rao garu constructed the temple with his own funds and dedicated his whole life in sannidhi of lord Raganayaka.

Some of the greatest gurus Warangal or Telangana has seen so far are Nallan Chakravarthulu Ragunatha Charyulu and Nellutla Venakteshwara Rao.

References

Villages in Jangaon district